José Mendes (born 13 April 1972) is a Portuguese sprinter. He competed in the men's 4 × 400 metres relay at the 1992 Summer Olympics.

References

1972 births
Living people
Athletes (track and field) at the 1992 Summer Olympics
Portuguese male sprinters
Olympic athletes of Portugal
Place of birth missing (living people)